The Mayoral election of 1937 in Pittsburgh, Pennsylvania was held on Tuesday, November 2, 1937. Incumbent Democrat Conn Scully, the former City Council President who had assumed the executive rank in October 1936, after the resignation of William McNair, was elected to a first full term.

Background
The McNair administration had been shrouded in controversy, including hostile relations between the mayor and both city council and the county bureaucracy, as well as a slow response to the devastating St. Patrick's Day Flood. Scully had been a vocal McNair adversary and was closely connected to David L. Lawrence, the state party chairman and city political leader (who later became mayor); this position saved the mayor's office for Democrats, who had been only recently empowered in the city. The race featured a strong GOP opponent in Bob Waddell, the popular football coach at Carnegie Tech (now Carnegie Mellon University). 

Councilman Abe Wolk made the formation of a Pittsburgh Civic Light Opera a major campaign issue for both candidates.

Results

References

1937 Pennsylvania elections
1937
1937 United States mayoral elections
1930s in Pittsburgh
November 1937 events